Gwenn is a surname and given name of Breton origin, being a variant of the name Gwen. Notable people with the surname or given name include:

Surname
Edmund Gwenn (1877-1959), English actor

Given name
Gwenn-Aël Bolloré (1925-2001), French soldier, businessman, author, and publisher
Gwenn Flowers, American glaciologist 
Gwenn Foulon (born 1998), French professional footballer
Gwenn Seemel (born 1981), American painter

See also
Gwenn ha du (disambiguation)
Gwen (given name)